HIP 41378 c (also known as EPIC 211311380 c)  is an exoplanet orbiting around the F-type star HIP 41378. It has a radius about 2.7 times that of Earth.

See also
 Lists of exoplanets
 Gliese 1132 b, rocky exoplanet with a confirmed atmosphere.
 Mu Arae c, in the constellation Ara
 Planetary system

References

Exoplanets discovered in 2016
Transiting exoplanets
HIP 41378
Cancer (constellation)